Isopoda is an order of crustaceans that includes woodlice and their relatives. Isopods live in the sea, in fresh water, or on land. All have rigid, segmented exoskeletons, two pairs of antennae, seven pairs of jointed limbs on the thorax, and five pairs of branching appendages on the abdomen that are used in respiration. Females brood their young in a pouch under their thorax. 

Isopods have various feeding methods: some eat dead or decaying plant and animal matter, others are grazers, or filter feeders, a few are predators, and some are internal or external parasites, mostly of fish. Aquatic species mostly live on the seabed or bottom of freshwater bodies of water, but some taxa can swim for a short distance. Terrestrial forms move around by crawling and tend to be found in cool, moist places. Some species are able to roll themselves into a ball as a defense mechanism or to conserve moisture. 

There are over 10,000 identified species of isopod worldwide, with around 4,500 species found in marine environments, mostly on the seabed, 500 species in fresh water, and another 5,000 species on land. The order is divided into eleven suborders. The fossil record of isopods dates back to the Carboniferous period (in the Pennsylvanian epoch), at least 300 million years ago, when isopods lived in shallow seas.

Description

Classified within the arthropods, isopods have a chitinous exoskeleton and jointed limbs. Isopods are typically flattened dorsoventrally (broader than they are deep), although many species deviate from this rule, particularly parasitic forms, and those living in the deep sea or in ground water habitats. Their colour may vary, from grey to white, or in some cases red, green, or brown. Giant isopods lack an obvious carapace (shell), which is reduced to a "cephalic shield" covering only the head. This means that the gill-like structures, which in other related groups are protected by the carapace, are instead found on specialised limbs on the abdomen. The dorsal (upper) surface of the animal is covered by a series of overlapping, articulated plates which give protection while also providing flexibility. The isopod body plan consists of a head (cephalon), a thorax (pereon) with seven segments (pereonites), and an abdomen (pleon) with six segments (pleonites), some of which may be fused. The head is fused with the first segment of the thorax to form the cephalon. There are two pairs of unbranched antennae, the first pair being vestigial in land-dwelling species. The eyes are compound and unstalked and the mouthparts include a pair of maxillipeds and a pair of mandibles (jaws) with palps (segmented appendages with sensory functions) and lacinia mobilis (spine-like movable appendages).

The seven free segments of the thorax each bear a pair of unbranched pereopods (limbs). In most species these are used for locomotion and are of much the same size, morphology and orientation, giving the order its name "Isopoda", from the Greek equal foot. In a few species, the front pair are modified into gnathopods with clawed, gripping terminal segments. The pereopods are not used in respiration, as are the equivalent limbs in amphipods, but the coxae (first segments) are fused to the tergites (dorsal plates) to form epimera (side plates). In mature females, some or all of the limbs have appendages known as oostegites which fold underneath the thorax and form a brood chamber for the eggs. In males, the gonopores (genital openings) are on the ventral surface of segment eight and in the females, they are in a similar position on segment six.

One or more of the abdominal segments, starting with the sixth segment, is fused to the telson (terminal section) to form a rigid pleotelson. The first five abdominal segments each bear a pair of biramous (branching in two) pleopods (lamellar structures which serve the function of gas exchange, and in aquatic species serve as gills and propulsion), and the last segment bears a pair of biramous uropods (posterior limbs). In males, the second pair of pleopods, and sometimes also the first, are modified for use in transferring sperm. The endopods (inner branches of the pleopods) are modified into structures with thin, permeable cuticles (flexible outer coverings) which act as gills for gas exchange. In some terrestrial isopods, these resemble lungs.

Diversity and classification

Isopods belong to the larger group Peracarida, which are united by the presence of a special chamber under the thorax for brooding eggs. They have a cosmopolitan distribution and over 10,000 species of isopod, classified into 11 suborders, have been described worldwide. Around 4,500 species are found in marine environments, mostly on the sea floor. About 500 species are found in fresh water and another 5,000 species are the terrestrial woodlice, which form the suborder Oniscidea. In the deep sea, members of the suborder Asellota predominate, to the near exclusion of all other isopods, having undergone a large adaptive radiation in that environment. The largest isopod is in the genus Bathynomus and some large species are fished commercially for human food in Mexico, Japan and Hawaii.

Some isopod groups have evolved a parasitic lifestyle, particularly as external parasites of fish. They can damage or kill their hosts and can cause significant economic loss to commercial fisheries. In reef aquariums, parasitic isopods can become a pest, endangering the fish and possibly injuring the aquarium keeper. Some members of the family Cirolanidae suck the blood of fish, and others, in the family Aegidae, consume the blood, fins, tail and flesh and can kill the fish in the process.

The World Marine, Freshwater and Terrestrial Isopod Crustaceans database subdivides the order into eleven suborders:
Asellota – This suborder contains the superfamily Aselloidea, a group that contains most of the freshwater isopods in the northern hemisphere, and the superfamilies Stenetrioidea, Gnathostenetroidoidea and Janiroidea, which are mostly marine. The latter superfamily, Janiroidea, has a massive radiation of deepsea families, many which have taken bizarre forms.
Calabozoida – A small suborder consisting of two marine species in the family Calabozoidae and one freshwater species in the family Brasileirinidae which is found in subterranean locations.
Cymothoida – Chiefly marine isopods with over 2,700 species. Members are mostly carnivorous or parasitic. Includes the family Gnathiidae, the juveniles of which are parasitic on fishes. The previously recognised suborder Epicaridea is included as two superfamilies within this suborder and Cymothoida now includes part of the formerly recognised suborder Flabellifera. Also includes the former suborder Anthuridea, a group of worm-like isopods with very long bodies.
Limnoriidea – Mainly tropical isopods, some of which are herbivorous.
Microcerberidea – Tiny, worm-like isopods that live between particles on the bed of freshwater and shallow marine habitats.
Oniscidea – Semi-terrestrial and terrestrial isopods fully adapted for life on land. There are over 4,000 species of woodlice inhabiting forests, mountains, deserts and the littoral zone.
Phoratopidea – A single marine species, Phoratopus remex, which warrants its own suborder because of its unique characteristics.
Phreatoicidea – Small suborder of freshwater isopods resembling amphipods, limited to South Africa, India, Australia and New Zealand.
Sphaeromatidea – Benthic isopods mostly from the southern hemisphere with respiratory pleopods inside a branchial chamber. This suborder now includes part of the formerly recognised suborder Flabellifera.
Tainisopidea – Freshwater isopods in a "relictual environment".
Valvifera – A large group of benthic, marine isopods with respiratory pleopods inside a branchial chamber under the abdomen.

Evolutionary history
Isopods first appeared in the fossil record during the Carboniferous period of the Paleozoic some 300 million years ago. They were primitive, short-tailed members of the suborder Phreatoicidea. At that time, Phreatoicideans were marine organisms with a cosmopolitan distribution. Nowadays, the members of this formerly widespread suborder form relic populations in freshwater environments in South Africa, India and Oceania, the greatest number of species being in Tasmania. Other primitive, short-tailed suborders include Asellota, Microcerberidea, Calabozoidea and the terrestrial Oniscidea.

The short-tailed isopods have a short pleotelson and terminal, stylus-like uropods and have a sedentary lifestyle on or under the sediment on the seabed. The long-tailed isopods have a long pleotelson and broad lateral uropods which can be used in swimming. They are much more active and can launch themselves off the seabed and swim for short distances. The more advanced long-tailed isopods are mostly endemic to the southern hemisphere and may have radiated on the ancient supercontinent of Gondwana soon after it broke away from Laurasia 200 million years ago. The short-tailed forms may have been driven from the shallow seas in which they lived by increased predatory pressure from marine fish, their main predators. The development of the long-tailed forms may also have provided competition that helped force the short-tailed forms into refugia. The latter are now restricted to environments such as the deep sea, freshwater, groundwater and dry land. Isopods in the suborder Asellota are by far the most species-rich group of deep sea isopods.

Locomotion
Unlike the amphipods, marine and freshwater isopods are entirely benthic. This gives them little chance to disperse to new regions and may explain why so many species are endemic to restricted ranges. Crawling is the primary means of locomotion, and some species bore into the seabed, the ground or timber structures. Some members of the Flabellifera can swim to a limited extent and have their front three pairs of pleopods modified for this purpose, with their respiratory structures limited to the hind pleopods. Most terrestrial species are slow-moving and conceal themselves under objects or hide in crevices or under bark. The semi-terrestrial sea slaters (Ligia spp.) can run rapidly on land and many terrestrial species can roll themselves into a ball when threatened, a feature that has evolved independently in different groups and also in the marine sphaeromatids.

Feeding and nutrition

Isopods have a simple gut which lacks a midgut section; instead there are caeca connected to the back of the stomach in which absorption takes place. Food is sucked into the esophagus, a process enhanced in the blood-sucking parasitic species, and passed by peristalsis into the stomach, where the material is processed and filtered. The structure of the stomach varies, but in many species there is a dorsal groove into which indigestible material is channelled and a ventral part connected to the caeca where intracellular digestion and absorption take place. Indigestible material passes on through the hindgut and is eliminated through the anus, which is on the pleotelson.

Isopods are detritivores, browsers, carnivores (including predators and scavengers), parasites, and filter feeders, and may occupy one or more of these feeding niches. Only aquatic and marine species are known to be parasites or filter feeders. Some exhibit coprophagia and will also consume their own fecal pellets. Terrestrial species are in general herbivorous, with woodlice feeding on moss, bark, algae, fungi and decaying material. In marine isopods that feed on wood, cellulose is digested by enzymes secreted in the caeca. Limnoria lignorum, for example, bores into wood and additionally feeds on the mycelia of fungi attacking the timber, thus increasing the nitrogen in its diet. Land-based wood-borers mostly house symbiotic bacteria in the hindgut which aid in digesting cellulose. There are numerous adaptations to this simple gut, but these are mostly correlated with diet rather than by taxonomic group.

Parasitic species are mostly external parasites of fish or crustaceans and feed on blood. The larvae of the Gnathiidae family and adult cymothoidids have piercing and sucking mouthparts and clawed limbs adapted for clinging onto their hosts. In general, isopod parasites have diverse lifestyles and include Cancricepon elegans, found in the gill chambers of crabs; Athelges tenuicaudis, attached to the abdomen of hermit crabs; Crinoniscus equitans living inside the barnacle Balanus perforatus; cyproniscids, living inside ostracods and free-living isopods; bopyrids, living in the gill chambers or on the carapace of shrimps and crabs and causing a characteristic bulge which is even recognisable in some fossil crustaceans; and entoniscidae living inside some species of crab and shrimp. Cymothoa exigua is a parasite of the spotted rose snapper Lutjanus guttatus in the Gulf of California; it causes the tongue of the fish to atrophy and takes its place in what is believed to be the first instance discovered of a parasite functionally replacing a host structure in animals.

Reproduction and development
In most species, the sexes are separate and there is little sexual dimorphism, but a few species are hermaphroditic and some parasitic forms show large differences between the sexes. Some Cymothoidans are protandrous hermaphrodites, starting life as males and later changing sex, and some Anthuroideans are the reverse, being protogynous hermaphrodites that are born female. Some Gnathiidans males are sessile and live with a group of females. Males have a pair of penises, which may be fused in some species. The sperm is transferred to the female by the modified second pleopod which receives it from the penis and which is then inserted into a female gonopore. The sperm is stored in a special receptacle, a swelling on the oviduct close to the gonopore. Fertilisation only takes place when the eggs are shed soon after a moult, at which time a connection is established between the semen receptacle and the oviduct.

The eggs, which may number up to several hundred, are brooded by the female in the marsupium, a chamber formed by flat plates known as oostegites under the thorax. This is filled with water even in terrestrial species. The eggs hatch as mancae, a post-larval stage which resembles the adult except for the absence of the last pair of pereopods. The lack of a swimming phase in the life cycle is a limiting factor in isopod dispersal, and may be responsible for the high levels of endemism in the order. As adults, isopods differ from other crustaceans in that moulting occurs in two stages known as "biphasic moulting". First they shed the exoskeleton from the posterior part of their body and later shed the anterior part. The giant Antarctic isopod Glyptonotus antarcticus is an exception, and moults in a single process.

Terrestrial isopods
 
The majority of crustaceans are aquatic and the isopods are one of the few groups of which some members now live on land. The only other crustaceans which include a small number of terrestrial species are amphipods (like sandhoppers) and decapods (crabs, shrimp, etc.). Terrestrial isopods play an important role in many tropical and temperate ecosystems by aiding in the decomposition of plant material through mechanical and chemical means, and by enhancing the activity of microbes. Macro-detritivores, including terrestrial isopods, are absent from arctic and sub-arctic regions, but have the potential to expand their range with increased temperatures in high latitudes.

The woodlice, suborder Oniscidea, are the most successful group of terrestrial crustaceans and show various adaptations for life on land. They are subject to evaporation, especially from their ventral area, and as they do not have a waxy cuticle, they need to conserve water, often living in a humid environment and sheltering under stones, bark, debris or leaf litter. Desert species are usually nocturnal, spending the day in a burrow and emerging at night. Moisture is achieved through food sources or by drinking, and some species can form their paired uropodal appendages into a tube and funnel water from dewdrops onto their pleopods. In many taxa, the respiratory structures on the endopods are internal, with a spiracle and pseudotrachaea, which resemble lungs. In others, the endopod is folded inside the adjoining exopod (outer branch of the pleopod). Both these arrangements help to prevent evaporation from the respiratory surfaces.

Many species can roll themselves into a ball, a behaviour used in defence that also conserves moisture. Members of the families Ligiidae and Tylidae, commonly known as rock lice or sea slaters, are the least specialised of the woodlice for life on land. They inhabit the splash zone on rocky shores, jetties and pilings, may hide under debris washed up on the shore and can swim if immersed in water.

As pets 
Many species have become popular as pets in the last few decades. With this popularity new variants, or morphs, have been selectively bred : for example Porcellionides pruinosus which are among the most popular and beginner-friendly 
have been bred to appear in "powder blue", "powder orange", and "powder purple". For enthusiasts, the most sought after species comes from Thailand, the Cubaris sp. Rubber Ducky. Many people keep isopods with their reptiles and amphibians as a "cleanup crew" in bioactive vivaria, whilst others keep them by themselves for their interesting activity and ease of care.

References

External links

World List of Marine Freshwater and Terrestrial Isopod Crustaceans

 
Malacostraca
Extant Pennsylvanian first appearances
Taxa named by Pierre André Latreille
Rolling animals
Crustacean orders